Billbergia minarum is a plant species in the genus Billbergia. This species is native to Brazil.

References

minarum
Endemic flora of Brazil
Flora of the Atlantic Forest
Flora of Espírito Santo
Flora of Minas Gerais